Santa Rosa is a district of the Tilarán canton, in the Guanacaste province of Costa Rica.

Geography 
Santa Rosa has an area of  km² and an elevation of  metres.

Locations 
Poblados: Aguilares, Campos Azules, Montes de Oro (part), Naranjos Agrios, Palma, Quebrada Azul, Ranchitos, Santa Rosa

Demographics 

For the 2011 census, Santa Rosa had a population of  inhabitants.

Transportation

Road transportation 
The district is covered by the following road routes:
 National Route 142
 National Route 927

References 

Districts of Guanacaste Province
Populated places in Guanacaste Province